The Judging Eye is the first book in the Aspect-Emperor series by R. Scott Bakker. It was published on January 15, 2009 in the UK and on February 19, 2009 in the USA.

Events take place 20 years after the conclusion of the Prince of Nothing trilogy. Anasûrimbor Kellhus now rules the Three Seas as Aspect-Emperor, and has launched The Great Ordeal - an assault on Golgotterath and The Consult by all of the nations of the Three Seas. Drusas Achamian, the former Mandate Schoolman, is in hiding, obsessed with trying to determine Kellhus' origins.

References

Canadian fantasy novels
Prince of Nothing
The Overlook Press books
2009 Canadian novels
Orbit Books books